Firefighter Mountain is a summit in Flathead County, Montana, in the United States. It is located within Flathead National Forest.

References

Mountains of Flathead County, Montana
Mountains of Montana